Cymatosaurus is an extinct genus of pistosauroid or nothosauriform sauropterygian. It is known to have been alive from the Early Triassic to the Middle Triassic period (latest Olenekian to Anisian stages) of Germany and they seem to originate from the Netherlands.

See also

 Timeline of plesiosaur research

References

Fossil taxa described in 1894
Early Triassic reptiles of Europe
Pistosaurs
Triassic sauropterygians
Olenekian genus first appearances
Anisian genus extinctions
Middle Triassic reptiles of Europe
Anisian life
Sauropterygian genera